The Chatuchak Weekend Market, on Kamphaeng Phet 2 Road, Chatuchak, Bangkok, is the largest market in Thailand. Also known as JJ Market, it has more than 15,000 stalls and 11,505 vendors (2019), divided into 27 sections. Chatuchak Market sells many different kinds of goods, including plants, antiques, consumer electronics, cosmetics, pets, fresh and dry food and drinks, ceramics, furniture and home accessories, clothing, and books.

It is the world's largest and most diverse weekend market, with over 200,000 visitors every weekend.

History
Chatuchak Market has been open since 1942. In 1948, Prime Minister Plaek Phibunsongkhram had a policy that every province was required to have its own market. Bangkok chose Sanam Luang as the market site. After a few months, the government moved the market to Sanam Chai. The market moved back to Sanam Luang in 1958. 

Starting in 1975, General Kriangsak Chamanan have the policy to use Sanam Luang as a place of recreational activity for the populace which will also be used for commemorating ceremony. As General Kriangsak Chamanan was the chairman of State Railway of Thailand as that time, he thus permitted the use of land on the south side of Chatuchak Park as a market. His design was to recycled waste from the looming Din Daeng Garbage Mountain which has stacked up across the decades to use as landfills, where he recruited military engineers for the job. The park was fully completed in 1978, when General Kriangsak Chomanan became the Prime Minister.  

By 1983, all of the merchants had moved to Chatuchak. At that time the market was called Phahonyothin Market. In 1987, its name was changed to Chatuchak Market.

The clock tower is a distinctive landmark in the Chatuchuk Market. It was built in 1987 on the occasion of King Bhumibol Adulyadej's 60th birthday on 5 December 1987, a cooperative effort of the market administration and Thai-Chinese Merchant Association.

Economics
Monthly stall rent for vendors at the market ranges from 10,600 to 17,700 baht. A University of the Thai Chamber of Commerce (UTCC) study found that most merchants have been selling at the weekend market for four to six years and have an average sales revenue of 139,500 baht per month.

Trade in illegal wildlife
Studies have shown that the Chatuchak Market is a centre for trade in illegal wildlife.

In a survey conducted on 28–29 March 2015, researchers counted 1,271 birds of 117 species for sale in 45 shops or stalls. Of the total, nine species were listed as "Threatened" on the IUCN Red List and eight species as "Near Threatened".

Market sections 
Clothing and accessories (sections 2–6, 10–26)
Handicrafts (sections 8–11)
Ceramics (sections 11, 13, 15, 17, 19, 25)
Furniture and home decor (sections 1,3,4,7,8)
Food and beverage (sections 2, 3, 4, 23, 24, 26, 27)
Plants and gardening (sections 3, 4)
Art and galleries (section 7)
Pets and accessories (sections 8, 9, 11, 13)
Books (sections 1, 27)
Antiques and collectibles (sections 1, 26)
Miscellaneous and used clothing (sections 2, 3, 4, 5, 6, 22, 25, 26)

Gallery

References

External links
 Chatuchak Market Website

Retail markets in Bangkok
Buildings and structures in Bangkok
Chatuchak district